Oyun Musa ("Moses Springs", عيون موسى), found 20 km south of the Ahmed Hamdi Tunnel in South Sinai, are a collection of fresh water springs said to be those in the area referred to as Elim in Exodus 15:27. This would be where Moses went with the Israelites during the Israelite Exodus after he was directed by Yahweh to throw a tree branch, possibly a barberry, into the bitter springs of Marah, making them sweet enough to drink(Exodus 15:25).

The springs are located on the main Suez to Sharm el Sheikh road behind a Bedouin village settlement of the same name.

See also
Elim (Bible)

Springs of Egypt
South Sinai Governorate